Badminton House is a large country house and Grade I Listed Building in Badminton, Gloucestershire, England, which has been the principal seat of the Dukes of Beaufort since the late 17th century. The house, which has given its name to the sport of badminton, is set among 52,000 acres of land. The gardens and park surrounding the house are listed at Grade I on the Register of Historic Parks and Gardens.

History

In 1612 Edward Somerset, 4th Earl of Worcester, bought from Nicholas Boteler his manors of Great and Little Badminton, called 'Madmintune' in the Domesday Book while one century earlier the name 'Badimyncgtun' was recorded, held by that family since 1275. Edward Somerset's third son Sir Thomas Somerset modernized the old house in the late 1620s, and built a new T-shaped gabled range. Evidence suggests he also built up on the present north and west fronts.

The Dukes of Beaufort acquired the property in the late 17th century, when the family moved from Raglan Castle, Monmouthshire, which had been ruined in the Civil War. The third duke adapted Sir Thomas Somerset's house by incorporating his several gabled ranges around the courtyard and extending the old house eastwards to provide a new set of domestic apartments. He raised a grand Jonesian centrepiece on the north front. The two-bay flanking elevations were five storeys high, reduced to three storeys in 1713. Their domed crowning pavilions are by James Gibbs.

For the fourth duke, who succeeded his brother in 1745, the architect William Kent renovated and extended the house in the Palladian style, but many earlier elements remain. The duke was instrumental in bringing the Italian artist Canaletto to England: Canaletto's two views of Badminton remain in the house.

Connections 
Whether or not the sport of badminton was re-introduced from British India or was invented during the hard winter of 1863 by the children of the eighth duke in the Great Hall (where the featherweight shuttlecock would not mar the life-size portraits of horses by John Wootton, as the tradition of the house has it), it was popularised at the house, hence the sport's name.

Queen Mary stayed at Badminton House for much of World War II. Her staff occupied most of the building, to the Duke and Duchess of Beaufort's inconvenience. Afterward, when the Duchess of Beaufort, who was Queen Mary's niece, was asked in which part of the great house the Queen had resided, she responded "She lived in all of it."

In the later 20th century, Badminton House became best known for the annual Badminton Horse Trials held there since 1949.

Badminton House has also been strongly associated with fox hunting. Successive Dukes of Beaufort have been masters of the Beaufort Hunt, one of the two most famous hunts in the United Kingdom alongside the Quorn Hunt.

Weddings and parties can be booked at Badminton House. Occasionally, houses and cottage on the estate can be rented. The estate was the location for some scenes of the films The Remains of the Day, 28 Days Later and Pearl Harbor.

Associated buildings
Except for the Grade I listed parish church and Worcester Lodge, all structures named below are Grade II* listed.

Parish church
Adjacent to Badminton House is the Grade I listed parish church of St Michael and All Angels, built in 1785. It serves as the principal burial place of the Somerset family; nearly all Dukes and Duchesses of Beaufort are interred here.

Domestic buildings 
 The 11-bay orangery of 1711 by Thomas Bateman
 An early 18th century laundry in Queen Anne style, now a house
 A similar brewery, also now a house
 The servants' wing southwest of the house, three ranges, late 17th century, altered and extended in the 19th
Stables, barns and blacksmith's shop forming the four sides of the stable court, 1878, possibly by T. H. Wyatt

Worcester Lodge 

At the north entrance to the park, near the Tetbury road and reached from the house by the Three Mile Ride, the Grade I listed Worcester Lodge was designed in 1746 by William Kent. The part-rusticated main block has four storeys. Over the high central archway is a dining room with generous windows and balustraded balconies; a pediment bears the Beaufort arms and the roof is partly domed. The room has a plaster ceiling by Kent, depicting fruit and flowers of the four seasons, described as very fine by Historic England. Kent also designed the convex mirror with a sunburst pattern. Outside, the ornamental flanking quadrant walls on both sides finish at small pavilions.

Other estate buildings 
Several buildings and follies were designed by Thomas Wright of Durham, around 1750.

 West of the house, Castle Barn is a castellated range of buildings including a barn and two flanking dovecote towers
 In the deer park, the park-keeper's house is styled as a rustic cottage, one storey with attics
 Nearby, the Hermit's Cell or Root House is a small square wooden building with a thatched roof
 Lower Slait Lodge, at the northwest entrance, has two storeys in Gothick style with four hexagonal corner turrets
 Set on a motte at the end of a main drive from Badminton House is the folly known as Ragged Castle, now roofless and a building at risk

See also
Badminton Library
Badminton cabinet

Notes

References

External links

Official website of the Badminton Estate
Badminton House entry from The DiCamillo Companion to British & Irish Country Houses
 About half of this article is devoted to a discussion of Badminton House.

Badminton
Country houses in Gloucestershire
English gardens in English Landscape Garden style
Folly castles in England
Gardens in Gloucestershire
Grade I listed houses in Gloucestershire
Grade I listed parks and gardens in Gloucestershire
Gardens by Capability Brown
Palladian architecture in England
William Kent buildings